A hidden tax is a tax that is not visible to the taxpayer. These taxes can raise prices of goods and lower salaries for workers. Hidden taxes, although hidden, can decrease the purchasing power of individuals significantly.

Many kinds of tax behave like hidden taxes:
Corporate income tax Because of this tax, shareholders and employees get less dividends and salary. Also the tax is hidden in the cost of goods and services and, therefore, paid by the consumer.
Tariffs or import taxes It lowers competition by raising the price of imports and products produced outside.
Sin taxes Taxes on alcohol and cigarettes are highly regressive.
Travel taxes
Utilities taxes According to a 1998 study, taxes take up 48% of the price of gasoline.
Inflation tax It is a hidden regressive tax.
Financial repression A range of measures which governments can employ to reduce their debt, which are often accompanied by inflation.
Profits from government-owned corporations Especially when a government-owned corporation enjoys a legally protected monopoly and records excessive profits, such profits may be criticized as hidden taxation. Governments in some jurisdictions directly own utilities (making such profits related to utility taxes) and some monopolize the alcohol trade (making such profits related to sin taxes).
Sales taxes such as turnover taxes

United States

A study by the Institute for Policy Innovation suggested that hidden taxes account $2,462 per capita.

Hidden tax
Quintiles of Household Cash Money Income according to the Tax Foundation, Calendar Year 2004

.

References

External links
Personalizing the Corporate Income Tax
Hidden Taxes: How Much do You Really Pay? 
WHO PAYS TAXES AND WHO RECEIVES GOVERNMENT SPENDING? AN ANALYSIS OF FEDERAL, STATE AND LOCAL TAX AND SPENDING DISTRIBUTIONS, 1991-2004
International Burdens of the Corporate Income Tax

Tax incidence